Hanatarashi, meaning "sniveler" or "snot-nosed" in Japanese, was a noise band created by later Boredoms frontman Yamantaka Eye and featured Zeni Geva guitarist Mitsuru Tabata. The outfit was formed in Osaka, Japan in 1983 after Eye and Tabata met as stage hands at an Einstürzende Neubauten show. After the release of the first album, the "I" was dropped and the name became "Hanatarash".

They used a variety of unusual noise-making objects, including power tools, drills, and heavy machinery.

Live shows
Hanatarash was notorious for their dangerous live shows. Some of the band's most infamous shows included Eye cutting a dead cat in half with a machete, strapping a circular saw to his back and almost cutting his leg off, and destroying part of a venue with an excavator (and not a bulldozer against common beliefs) by driving it through the back wall and onto the stage.

At a 1985 show in Tokyo's Superloft, the audience were required to fill out forms due to the possibility of harm caused by the show. The show was stopped due to Eye preparing to throw a lit molotov cocktail onto the stage. The performance cost ¥600,000 (approximately $9,000 US) in repairs.

After several years of the intense live shows, Hanatarash was forbidden from performing at most venues, and were only allowed to return to live performances in the 1990s after Eye would agree to cease his destructive on-stage behavior.

Partial discography 
 Take Back Your Penis! Cassette (Condome Cassex, 1984)
 Hanatarashi LP (Alchemy, 1985)
 2 LP (Alchemy, 1988)
 3 LP (RRRecords, 1989) CD (RRRecords, 1992)
 The Hanatarash and His eYe 7" (Public Bath, 1992)
 4: AIDS-a-Delic CD (Public Bath, 1994)
 5: We Are 0:00 CD (Shock City, Trattoria, 1996)
 Live!! 84 Dec. 16 Zabo-Kyoto CD (MoM'n'DaD Productions, 1993)
 Live!! 88 Feb. 21 Antiknock / Tokyo CD (MoM'n'DaD Productions, 1992)
 Live!! 82 Apr. 12 Studio Ahiru / Osaka CD (MoM'n'DaD Productions, 1993)

References

Noise musical groups
Japanese industrial music groups
Musical groups from Osaka